Tetra is the common name of many small freshwater characiform fishes. Tetras come from Africa, Central America, and South America, belonging to the biological family Characidae and to its former subfamilies Alestidae (the "African tetras") and Lebiasinidae. The Characidae are distinguished from other fish by the presence of a small adipose fin between the dorsal and caudal fins. Many of these, such as the neon tetra (Paracheirodon innesi), are brightly colored and easy to keep in captivity.  Consequently, they are extremely popular for home aquaria.

Tetra is no longer a taxonomic, phylogenetic term. It is short for Tetragonopterus, a genus name formerly applied to many of these fish, which is Greek for "square-finned" (literally, four-sided-wing).

Because of the popularity of tetras in the fishkeeping hobby, many unrelated fish are commonly known as tetras, including species from different families. Even vastly different fish may be called tetras. For example, payara (Hydrolycus scomberoides) is occasionally known as the "sabretooth tetra" or "vampire tetra".

Tetras generally have compressed (sometimes deep), fusiform bodies and are typically identifiable by their fins. They ordinarily possess a homocercal caudal fin (a twin-lobed, or forked, tail fin whose upper and lower lobes are of equal size) and a tall dorsal fin characterized by a short connection to the fish's body. Additionally, tetras possess a long anal fin stretching from a position just posterior of the dorsal fin and ending on the ventral caudal peduncle, and a small, fleshy adipose fin located dorsally between the dorsal and caudal fins. This adipose fin represents the fourth unpaired fin on the fish (the four unpaired fins are the caudal fin, dorsal fin, anal fin, and adipose fin), lending to the name tetra, which is Greek for four. While this adipose fin is generally considered the distinguishing feature, some tetras (such as the emperor tetras, Nematobrycon palmeri) lack this appendage. Ichthyologists debate the function of the adipose fin, doubting its role in swimming due to its small size and lack of stiffening rays or spines.

Although the list below is sorted by common name, in a number of cases, the common name is applied to different species. Since the aquarium trade may use a different name for the same species, advanced aquarists tend to use scientific names for the less-common tetras. The list below is incomplete.

Species
Tetra species:
A–D

 Adonis tetra, Lepidarchus adonis
 African long-finned tetra, Brycinus longipinnis
 African moon tetra, Bathyaethiops caudomaculatus
 Arnold's tetra, Arnoldichthys spilopterus
 banded tetra, Astyanax fasciatus
 bandtail tetra, Moenkhausia dichroura
 barred glass tetra, Phenagoniates macrolepis
 beacon tetra, Hemigrammus ocellifer
 Belgian flag tetra, Hyphessobrycon heterorhabdus
 black darter tetra, Poecilocharax weitzmani
 black morpho tetra, Poecilocharax weitzmani
 black neon tetra, Hyphessobrycon herbertaxelrodi
 black phantom tetra, Hyphessobrycon megalopterus
 black tetra or butterfly tetra, Gymnocorymbus ternetzi
 black tetra, Gymnocorymbus thayer
 black wedge tetra, Hemigrammus pulcher
 blackband tetra, Hyphessobrycon scholzei
 blackedge tetra, Tyttocharax madeirae
 black-flag tetra, Hyphessobrycon rosaceus
 black-jacket tetra, Moenkhausia takasei
 blackline tetra, Hyphessobrycon scholzei
 bleeding heart tetra, Hyphessobrycon erythrostigma
 bleeding heart tetra, Hyphessobrycon socolofi
 blind tetra, Stygichthys typhlops
 bloodfin tetra, Aphyocharax anisitsi
 blue tetra, Boehlkea fredcochui
 blue tetra, Mimagoniates microlepis
 blue tetra, Tyttocharax madeirae
 brilliant rummynose tetra, Hemigrammus bleheri
 bucktooth tetra, Exodon paradoxus
 Buenos Aires tetra, Hyphessobrycon anisitsi
 Callistus tetra, Hyphessobrycon eques
 calypso tetra, Hyphessobrycon axelrodi
 cardinal tetra, Paracheirodon axelrodi
 Carlana tetra, Carlana eigenmanni
 Cochu's blue tetra, Knodus borki
 central tetra, Astyanax aeneus coffee-bean tetra, Hyphessobrycon takasei Colcibolca tetra, Astyanax nasutus Congo tetra, Phenacogrammus interruptus copper tetra, Hasemania melanura Costello tetra, Hemigrammus hyanuary creek tetra, Bryconamericus scleroparius creek tetra, Bryconamericus terrabensis croaking tetra, Mimagoniates inequalis croaking tetra, Mimagoniates lateralis dawn tetra, Aphyocharax paraguayensis dawn tetra, Hyphessobrycon eos diamond tetra, Moenkhausia pittieri discus tetra, Brachychalcinus orbicularis disk tetra, Myleus schomburgkii dragonfin tetra, Pseudocorynopoma doriaeE–Q

 ember tetra, Hyphessobrycon amandae emperor tetra, Nematobrycon palmeri false black tetra, Gymnocorymbus thayeri green neon tetra, Paracheirodon simulans false red nose tetra, Petitella georgiae false rummynose tetra, Petitella georgiae featherfin tetra, Hemigrammus unilineatus firehead tetra, Hemigrammus bleheri flag tetra, Hyphessobrycon heterorhabdus flame tail tetra, Aphyocharax erythrurus flame tetra, Hyphessobrycon flammeus garnet tetra, Hemigrammus pulcher glass tetra, Moenkhausia oligolepis glass bloodfin tetra, Prionobrama filigera glossy tetra, Moenkhausia oligolepis glowlight tetra, Hemigrammus erythrozonus gold tetra (aka golden tetra, or brass tetra), Hemigrammus rodwayi goldencrown tetra, Aphyocharax alburnus goldspotted tetra, Hyphessobrycon griemi gold-tailed tetra, Carlastyanax aurocaudatus green dwarf tetra, Odontocharacidium aphanes green neon tetra, Paracheirodon simulans green tetra, Paracheirodon simulans Griem's tetra, Hyphessobrycon griemi Head & Taillight tetra, Hemigrammus ocellifer Hy511 tetra, Hyphessobrycon sp. January tetra, Hemigrammus hyanuary Jellybean tetra, Lepidarchus adonis jewel tetra, Hyphessobrycon eques jumping tetra, Hemibrycon tridens largespot tetra, Astyanax orthodus lemon tetra, Hyphessobrycon pulchripinnis longfin tetra, Brycinus longipinnis long-finned glass tetra, Xenagoniates bondi longjaw tetra, Bramocharax bransfordii Loreto tetra, Hyphessobrycon loretoensis Mayan tetra, Hyphessobrycon compressus Mexican tetra, Astyanax mexicanus mimic scale-eating tetra, Probolodus heterostomus mourning tetra, Brycon pesu naked tetra, Gymnocharacinus bergii neon tetra, Paracheirodon innesi Niger tetra, Arnoldichthys spilopterus nurse tetra, Brycinus nurse oneline tetra, Nannaethiops unitaeniatus one-line tetra, Hemigrammus unilineatus orangefin tetra, Bryconops affinis ornate tetra, Hyphessobrycon bentosi Panama tetra, Hyphessobrycon panamensis penguin tetra, Thayeria boehlkei Peruvian tetra, Hyphessobrycon peruvianus petticoat tetra, Gymnocorymbus ternetzi phantom tetra, Hyphessobrycon megalopterus Pittier's tetra, Moenkhausia pittieri pretty tetra, Hemigrammus pulcher Pristella tetra, Pristella maxillaris Pygmy tetra, Odontostilbe dialepturaR–Z

 rainbow tetra, Nematobrycon lacortei rainbow tetra, Nematobrycon palmeri red eye tetra, Moenkhausia sanctaefilomenae Red Phantom Tetra, Hyphessobrycon sweglesi red tetra, Hyphessobrycon flammeus redspotted tetra, Copeina guttata rosy tetra, Hyphessobrycon bentosi rosy tetra, Hyphessobrycon rosaceus royal tetra, Inpaichthys kerri ruby tetra, Axelrodia riesei rummy-nose tetra, Hemigrammus rhodostomus (bleheri) sailfin tetra, Crenuchus spilurus savage tetra, Hyphessobrycon savagei savanna tetra, Hyphessobrycon stegemanni semaphore tetra, Pterobrycon myrnae serpae tetra, Hyphessobrycon eques sharptooth tetra, Micralestes acutidens silver tetra, Ctenobrycon spilurus silver tetra, Gymnocorymbus thayeri silver tetra, Micralestes acutidens silvertip tetra, Hasemania melanura silvertip tetra, Hasemania nana splash tetra, Copella arnoldi spotfin tetra, Hyphessobrycon socolofi spottail tetra, Moenkhausia dichroura spotted tetra, Copella nattereri Swegles's tetra, Hyphessobrycon sweglesi tailspot tetra, Bryconops caudomaculatus tetra von Rio, Hyphessobrycon flammeus three-lined African tetra, Neolebias trilineatus Tietê tetra, Brycon insignis Tortuguero tetra, Hyphessobrycon tortuguerae transparent tetra, Charax gibbosus true big-scale tetra, Brycinus macrolepidotus Uruguay tetra, Cheirodon interruptus white spot tetra, Aphyocharax paraguayensis x-ray tetra, Pristella maxillaris yellow tetra, Hyphessobrycon bifasciatus yellow-tailed African tetra, Alestopetersius caudalis''

References

 
Fish common names
Paraphyletic groups